Normani x Calvin Harris is a joint EP by American singer Normani and Scottish producer Calvin Harris. It was released on October 22, 2018. It features the songs "Checklist" (featuring Wizkid) and "Slow Down".

No singles were released from the EP, however, the song "Checklist" peaked at number one on Billboards World Digital Song Sales chart, and also charted in Ireland and in the United Kingdom; while the song "Slow Down" reached the top 40 on the Billboards Dance/Electronic Songs chart.

Background
According to Normani, Harris reached out to her for the collaboration; she said: "he was like 'yo, what do you think of this?' I was like, 'this sh*t is fire!' I am a huge fan of his." The pair recorded and finished the singles in June 2018.

News of the collaboration was revealed in June 2018. Normani teased the project at the 2018 American Music Awards, saying a song was to be released "in the next few days". Normani also posted a short clip online of herself writing "Oct. 22" on a piece of red tape before a voice off-camera tells her to "drop the pen".

Music
The EP features two songs, "Slow Down" and "Checklist" (featuring Nigerian singer Wizkid). The former has a groovy, house-styled production in which Normani pleads with a lover to return her feelings. Wandera Hussein of The Fader praised Normani's vocal performance by saying the singer sings "heavenly" on the song's hook. "Checklist" features a danceable beat with heavy influences of Afrobeats and dancehall music. On it, Normani delivers some rapid, half-rapped flirty lines.

Complex noted that the two tracks feature a production style similar to Harris's 2017 album Funk Wav Bounces Vol. 1, "although featuring a more reggae-inspired edge". Rolling Stone called the songs "clubby R&B with tropical tinges", saying Normani hits a "bouncy pop stride" on "Checklist", and noting "Slow Down" "does exactly the opposite of what the title teases: it's a slow jam that builds up to a house-y dancefloor burner for the verses".

Track listing
All songs were produced by Calvin Harris

Charts

"Checklist"

"Slow Down"

Certifications

References

2018 debut EPs
Albums produced by Calvin Harris
Calvin Harris albums
Collaborative albums
Contemporary R&B EPs
Electronic dance music EPs